Jatko Peak is a sharp-pointed peak rising to ,  northwest of Dykes Peak in the Clare Range of Victoria Land. Named by the Advisory Committee on Antarctic Names in 2007 after Joyce A. Jatko, Environmental Officer for the National Science Foundation’s Office of Polar Programs, 1994–2003; U.S. representative to the SCAR Committee for Environmental Protection and Vice Chair of the committee for two terms.

References

Mountains of Victoria Land